René Marill Albérès, or R. M. Albérès, was the pseudonym of René Marill (10 March 1921 – 25 May 1982), a French writer and literary critic. He published book-length studies of Antoine de Saint-Exupéry, André Gide, Gérard de Nerval, Jean Giraudoux, Jean-Paul Sartre, Michel Butor, Franz Kafka, as well as surveys of the novel in twentieth-century European literature.

Life
René Marill Albérès was born on 10 March 1921 in Perpignan. He studied at the 
École normale supérieure and the Faculty of Letters in Paris. From 1946 to 1954 he taught at the Institut Français in Buenos Aires. From 1954 to 1962 he taught at the Institut français de Florence. From 1962 to 1969 he taught at the University of Fribourg, and from 1969 for the University of Orléans.

In parallel with his academic career, Albérès was a journalist. He wrote for Figaro from 1950 to 1956, for the weekly Arts from 1956 to 1960, and for Les Nouvelles littéraires, where he had a column. His review of Georges Perec's novel La Disparition notoriously failed to notice the absence of the letter e in the novel:

He was a Chevalier of the Legion of Honour. He died on 25 May 1982 in Orléans.

Works
 Saint-Exupery, 1946
 L'odyssée d'André Gide [The odyssey of André Gide], 1950
 Gérard de Nerval, 1955
 Bilan littéraire du XXe siècle [Literary review of the twentieth century], 1956
 Esthétique et morale chez Jean Giraudoux [Aesthetics and morals in Jean Giraudoux], 1957. 
 L'aventure intellectuelle du XXe siècle; panorama des littératures européennes, 1900–1959 [The intellectual adventure of the twentieth century: a panorama of European literature], 1959
 Jean-Paul Sartre: philosopher without faith, 1960. Translated by Wade Baskin.
 'Neo-Marxism and criticism of dialectical reasoning' in Edith Kern, ed., Sartre: a collection of critical essays, 1962
 Histoire du roman moderne, [History of the modern novel], 1962
 Michel Butor, 1964
 Métamorphoses du roman [Metamorphoses of the novel], 1966
 (with Pierre de Boisdeffre) Kafka; the torment of man, 1967. Translated by Wade Baskin

References

1921 births
1982 deaths
French literary critics
École Normale Supérieure alumni
Academic staff of the University of Fribourg
Academic staff of the University of Orléans
Chevaliers of the Légion d'honneur
20th-century French journalists
French expatriates in Switzerland